Drammen HK  is a team handball club from Drammen, Norway. Currently, Drammen HK competes in the Norwegian First League of Handball.

The club was founded on March 3, 1992. The foundation was the result of a long going project where handball clubs in Drammen and Lier gathered to discuss how to build a "Top Team" candidate for the region. The project resulted in two clubs joining forces - Reistad IL from Lier and IF Sturla from Drammen. The two clubs transferred their senior players to the new club, but continued as separate entities concentrating on development of children and youngsters. The colors of Drammen HK became blue - the same color as background of the city coat of arms.
 
Reistad IL was qualified to play in Norway Premier Division, so Drammen really got a flying start starting at the top level. However, Drammen did not make it through and was degraded to the Second Division the year after. However, In 1993 Drammen HK signed the Swedish trainer Kent Harry Anderson, and returned to the Premier Division after one year. This was the beginning of a series of successes that was crowned in 1995, bringing home the City Cup as the first Norwegian club ever to win a European title.

Some of the best Norway international players started their senior careers at Drammen HK, such as Glenn Solberg, Frode Hagen and Kristian Kjelling.

Achievements
EHF Challenge Cup: 1
1996

Norwegian Premier Division: 4
1997, 2007, 2008, 2010

Norwegian Cup: 2
2008, 2017

External links

Norwegian handball clubs
Sport in Drammen
Sport in Buskerud